Taleh Kazimov (born September 11, 1983) is the Chairman of the Central Bank of the Republic of Azerbaijan since April 2022, as well as Chairman of the Management Board and Chief Executive Officer at the open joint-stock company PASHA Bank.

Life
Taleh Kazimov was born on September 11, 1983 in Baku, Azerbaijan. He studied at the Azerbaijan Technical University during 2000-2004 and received higher education with Bachelor Degree in Automation and Computer engineering. In 2004-2006 he received an MBA degree within the joint program of Georgia State University and Azerbaijan State Oil Academy. In addition, Kazimov successfully graduated from the London Business School, UK (Executive Education Program in Business Administration) in 2012 and the Harvard University, USA (Executive Education Program in Business Administration) in 2014.

Taleh Kazimov is married and has two children.

Professional career
Taleh Kazimov has extensive experience in traditional and digital banking (commercial and investment banking), and loan and risk management.

He started his career growth early at a young age, and during his studies worked as an office assistant and information technology operator at ATTAS PR and European Tobacco. His professional activity in the financial sector started in 2004. Thus, during the period from 02.2004 to 09.2006, Taleh Kazimov held various positions in Bank Standard CJSC. He worked as a specialist in the Treasury and Funds division of the Finance and Accounting Department, Management and Budget Planning division of the Financial Control Department. Later He worked as a leading specialist in the Corporate Customer Lending division of the Loan Policy Department.

From 09.2006 to 01.2007, Taleh Kazimov held the position of auditor at Ernst & Young. Then he worked as the General Director of Fineko Analytics and Information Agency OJSC during 01.2007 - 07.2007.

Taleh Kazimov has been working for PASHA Bank since 07.2007. At that time, he worked as a manager of the Risk Management Department, and from 08.2009 he held the position of the Treasury and Money Market Department director.

On December 7, 2011, Taleh Kazimov was elected a Board member of PASHA Bank. He was in charge of corporate and business banking, investment block, trade finance, financial institutions, and loan management.

On July 1, 2015, Taleh Kazimov was appointed Chairman of the Management Board and Chief Executive Officer of PASHA Bank. He is currently holding these positions.

PASHA Bank's success in the years under his leadership
During his tenure as director of PASHA Bank, Taleh Kazimov managed to increase the bank's assets and loan portfolio and ensure the high quality of the loan portfolio. Also, he founded the Digital Lab which provides innovative solutions to bank clients.

During 2015–2020, positive changes were observed in a number of PASHA Bank's indicators:
 The bank increased its portfolio by 287% (3.9 times), bringing the total market share to 14.3% and the market share of the corporate business portfolio to 21%.
 The interest rate on the non-performing portfolio decreased several times from 16% to 2.8% (current indicator is 2.9 times lower than market's actual non-performing portfolio ratio).
 Return on capital increased from 0.3% to 30%.
 The bank's net income is AZN 382 million (this figure is 4.5 times higher than those during the period of 2007-2015).
 Operating expenses account for only 35% of total operating income currently (this figure was 45.7% in 2014);
 Despite a 2.9-fold increase in the number of employees, the marginal rate of return on employment was reduced from 1.5% to 0.9%.
 In 2015, 28% of all customer applications went through digital channels, in 2020 this figure reached 95% for small and medium enterprises (SME banking) and 83% for corporate banking. In 2020, the volume of customer requests increased 6 times compared to 2015.

Under the leadership of Taleh Kazimov, PASHA Bank was awarded a number of prestigious awards. These include 'Best Bank in Azerbaijan', 'Best Bank Group' and 'Best Commercial Bank', 'Corporate Social Responsibility for Central and Eastern Europe and the CIS', 'Best Investment Bank of Azerbaijan', 'Leading Bank for Contactless POS Terminal Infrastructure', 'Best Private Banking', and 'Best Commercial Bank of Azerbaijan'.

Central Bank of Azerbaijan
On April 11, 2022, Parliamentary Committee on Economic Policy, Industry and Entrepreneurship considered the issue of electing Taleh Kazimov as a member of the Board of the Central Bank of the Republic of Azerbaijan on the recommendation of the President of the Republic of Azerbaijan Ilham Aliyev. The presentation of the President of the Republic of Azerbaijan Ilham Aliyev  was approved by voting at the plenary session held on April 12, 2022 and Taleh Kazimov was elected a member of the Board of the Central Bank of the Republic of Azerbaijan.

On April 13, 2022, by the order of the President of the Republic of Azerbaijan Ilham Aliyev, Taleh Kazimov was appointed Chairman of the Central Bank of the Republic of Azerbaijan.

Memberships
Taleh Kazimov was a member of the Supervisory Board of PASHA Bank Georgia from 2015 to 2018. In 2015-2019, he was a member of the Board of Directors and Vice President of the American Chamber of Commerce in Azerbaijan (AMCHAM). At the same time, in 2015-2019, he was a member of the Board of Directors of PASHA Investment Bank (Turkey). Since 2019, Taleh Kazimov is a member of the Board of Directors of the US-Azerbaijan Chamber of Commerce (USACC).

Awards and recognition
In 2019, Taleh Kazimov was awarded by EMEA Finance and recognized as a 'Best CEO' for Eastern Europe and post-Soviet countries.

References

1983 births
Azerbaijani bankers
Living people
Alumni of London Business School
Governors of Azerbaijan Central Bank
Azerbaijan State Oil and Industry University alumni
Azerbaijan Technical University alumni
Georgia State University alumni
Harvard University alumni
Businesspeople from Baku
Azerbaijani businesspeople